The Hiller X-18 was an experimental cargo transport aircraft designed to be the first testbed for tiltwing and V/STOL (vertical/short takeoff and landing) technology.

Development

Design work started in 1955 by Stanley Hiller Jr and Hiller Aircraft Corporation received a manufacturing contract and funding from the U.S. Air Force to build the only X-18 built, serialled 57-3078.

To speed up construction and conserve money, the plane was constructed from scavenged parts including a Chase YC-122C Avitruc fuselage, 49-2883, and turboprops from the Lockheed XFV-1 and Convair XFY-1 Pogo experimental fighter programs. The tri-bladed contra-rotating propellers were a giant 16 ft (4.8 m) across. The Westinghouse turbojet engine had its exhaust diverted upwards and downwards at the tail to give the plane pitch control at low speeds. Hiller nicknamed their X-18 the Propelloplane for public relations purposes.

Service history

Preliminary testing occurred at Moffett Field Naval Air Station, CA.  The first flight (hop) was on 11/20/1959 followed by the first real flight on 11/24/1959 with Hiller test pilots George Bright and Bruce Jones.  Further test flights were held at Edwards AFB, ultimately recording 20 flights. A number of problems plagued the X-18 including being susceptible to wind gusts when the wing rotated, acting like a sail. In addition the turboprop engines were not cross-linked, so the failure of one engine meant the airplane would crash. Thrust control was through throttle changes, which were too slow for acceptable height and roll control.

The crew regained control and landed, but the X-18 never flew again. However ground testing of the tiltwing concepts continued. Eventually a VTOL Test Stand was built on which the X-18's vertical takeoff and landing and hover control was to be tested. One engine run was successfully conducted to the full  wheel height on the VTOL Test Stand. The program was cancelled on January 18, 1964, before further VTOL Test Stand testing could be conducted, and the X-18 was cut up for scrap.

The program proved several things that contributed to further tilt-wing VSTOL technology programs:
cross-shafting between the engines was necessary in order to avoid loss of control in the event of an engine failure.
direct propeller pitch control was necessary for precise height and lateral control during VTOL and hover.

This knowledge was employed in the successful development and flight tests of the Tri-Service XC-142A, tilt-wing VSTOL transport.

Specifications (X-18)

See also

References

External links

 Hiller X-18
 X-18 Images
 X-18 Images and History

Edwards Air Force Base
X-18, Hiller
Tiltwing aircraft
Aircraft with contra-rotating propellers
X-18
Aircraft first flown in 1959
Twin-engined four-prop tractor aircraft